Charly Grosskost (5 March 1944 – 19 June 2004) was a French racing cyclist who in 1968 won the prologue time-trial of both the Giro d'Italia and the Tour de France. He won stages of the Tour de France and of the Giro d'Italia and on the track was French pursuit champion nine times. His sporting career began with A.C.B.B. Paris.

Early career
Grosskost came to notice when he was 19, when he won a stage of the Route de France – amateur counterpart of the Tour de France – and then won Strasbourg-Campagne by nearly 10 minutes after riding ahead of the race for more than 50 km. 
In 1965, he won the Route de France and five of its seven stages and became favourite for the still bigger race, the Tour de l'Avenir. There, however, he dropped out in the Pyrenees. A drug test that followed his retirement – it has entered cycling legend that other riders pushed him off his bike for his own safety as he began foaming at the mouth and riding erratically – led to his being suspended for a year. To his death, Grosskost insisted that he had been drugged by a team helper.

Professional career
Grosskost turned professional for Peugeot on 1 May 1966, alongside Eddy Merckx of Belgium, whom he beat to win his Giro prologue. He then moved to the Bic team alongside Jacques Anquetil.

In 1968 he won the prologue of the Giro d'Italia and became the third Frenchman to wear the leader's pink jersey after Louison Bobet and Raphaël Géminiani. That same year, Grosskost won the prologue time-trial of the Tour de France at Vittel and then the first conventional stage. He wore the leader's yellow jersey for three days and finished the Tour in 17th place.

Post-career
In retirement he became a cycle dealer.

Grosskost died in 2004, after he was hit by a car while cycling with friends.

Major results

1965
 1st Overall Route de France
1st Stages 1, 2, 4 & 5
 3rd Overall Tour d'Eure-et-Loir
1966
 8th Critérium des As
1967
 2nd Grand Prix de Cannes
1968
 Tour de France
1st Prologue & Stage 1
Held  for 2 days
 1st Prologue Giro d'Italia 
 2nd Milan–San Remo
 6th Overall Paris–Nice
1st Prologue
 7th Critérium National de la Route
 9th Overall Tour de l'Oise
1970
 2nd Grand Prix de Saint-Raphaël
 3rd Overall GP du Midi Libre
 6th Critérium des As
 7th Critérium National de la Route
1971
 1st Prologue & Stage 4 Four Days of Dunkirk
1972
 1st Prologue & Stage 3b Étoile des Espoirs
 1st Prologue Tour de l'Oise
 8th Overall Four Days of Dunkirk
1973
 7th Overall Paris–Nice

Track

1966
 1st  Pursuit, National Championships
1967
 1st  Omnium, National Championships
1968
 National Championships
1st  Pursuit
1st  Omnium
1969
 1st  Pursuit, National Championships
1970
 1st  Pursuit, National Championships
1974
 1st  Pursuit, National Championships

See also
 List of doping cases in cycling

References

External links

1944 births
2004 deaths
Sportspeople from Bas-Rhin
French male cyclists
French Tour de France stage winners
French Giro d'Italia stage winners
French track cyclists
Tour de France prologue winners
Doping cases in cycling
Cyclists from Grand Est